Mangora is a genus of  orb-weaver spiders first described by O. Pickard-Cambridge in 1889.

Species

 it contains 186 species in the Americas and the Caribbean:
M. acalypha (Walckenaer, 1802) – Madeira, Europe, North Africa, Turkey, Middle East, Caucasus, Russia (Europe to South Siberia), Central Asia, China
M. acaponeta Levi, 2005 – Mexico
M. acoripa Levi, 2007 – Brazil
M. acre Levi, 2007 – Colombia, Peru, Brazil
M. alinahui Levi, 2007 – Ecuador, Bolivia, Brazil
M. amacayacu Levi, 2007 – Colombia, Venezuela, Peru, Brazil
M. amchickeringi Levi, 2005 – Panama, Colombia, Venezuela, Trinidad
M. angulopicta Yin, Wang, Xie & Peng, 1990 – China
M. anilensis Levi, 2007 – Brazil
M. antillana Dierkens, 2012 – Martinique
M. antonio Levi, 2007 – Brazil
M. apaporis Levi, 2007 – Colombia, Peru
M. apobama Levi, 2007 – Peru, Bolivia, Brazil
M. argenteostriata Simon, 1897 – Brazil
M. aripeba Levi, 2007 – Brazil
M. aripuana Levi, 2007 – Brazil
M. asis Levi, 2007 – Colombia
M. ayo Levi, 2007 – Colombia
M. balbina Levi, 2007 – Brazil
M. bambusa Levi, 2007 – Colombia
M. barba Levi, 2007 – Colombia
M. bemberg Levi, 2007 – Brazil, Argentina
M. bimaculata (O. Pickard-Cambridge, 1889) – Mexico to Costa Rica
M. blumenau Levi, 2007 – Brazil
M. bocaina Levi, 2007 – Brazil
M. bonaldoi Levi, 2007 – Brazil
M. botelho Levi, 2007 – Brazil
M. bovis Levi, 2007 – Brazil, Guyana
M. boyaca Levi, 2007 – Colombia
M. brokopondo Levi, 2007 – Brazil, Guyana, Suriname, French Guiana
M. browns Levi, 2007 – Suriname
M. caballero Levi, 2007 – Brazil, Argentina
M. cajuta Levi, 2007 – Bolivia
M. calcarifera F. O. Pickard-Cambridge, 1904 – USA to Costa Rica
M. campeche Levi, 2005 – Mexico
M. candida Chickering, 1954 – Panama
M. caparu Levi, 2007 – Colombia
M. castelo Levi, 2007 – Brazil
M. caxias Levi, 2007 – Brazil, Argentina
M. cercado Levi, 2007 – Brazil
M. chacobo Levi, 2007 – Peru, Bolivia, Brazil
M. chanchamayo Levi, 2007 – Peru
M. chao Levi, 2007 – Brazil, Paraguay
M. chavantina Levi, 2007 – Brazil, French Guiana
M. chicanna Levi, 2005 – Mexico to Honduras
M. chiguaza Levi, 2007 – Ecuador, Peru
M. chispa Levi, 2007 – Peru
M. chuquisaca Levi, 2007 – Bolivia, Argentina
M. cochuna Levi, 2007 – Peru, Argentina
M. colonche Levi, 2007 – Peru, Ecuador
M. comaina Levi, 2007 – Peru
M. corcovado Levi, 2005 – Costa Rica
M. corocito Levi, 2007 – Venezuela, French Guiana
M. craigae Levi, 2005 – Costa Rica
M. crescopicta Yin, Wang, Xie & Peng, 1990 – China, Korea
M. cutucu Levi, 2007 – Ecuador
M. dagua Levi, 2007 – Colombia
M. dianasilvae Levi, 2007 – Colombia, Venezuela, Trinidad, Peru, Bolivia, Brazil
M. distincta Chickering, 1963 – Honduras to Costa Rica
M. divisor Levi, 2007 – Brazil
M. eberhardi Levi, 2007 – Colombia
M. engleri Levi, 2007 – Ecuador
M. enseada Levi, 2007 – Brazil, Argentina
M. explorama Levi, 2007 – Peru
M. falconae Schenkel, 1953 – Panama, Colombia, Venezuela
M. fascialata Franganillo, 1936 – USA to Honduras, Cuba, Hispaniola, Trinidad
M. florestal Levi, 2007 – Brazil
M. foliosa Zhu & Yin, 1998 – China
M. fornicata (Keyserling, 1864) – Colombia
M. fortuna Levi, 2005 – Costa Rica, Panama
M. fundo Levi, 2007 – Brazil
M. gibberosa (Hentz, 1847) – North America
M. goodnightorum Levi, 2005 – Mexico
M. grande Levi, 2007 – Venezuela
M. hemicraera (Thorell, 1890) – Malaysia
M. herbeoides (Bösenberg & Strand, 1906) – China, Korea, Japan
M. hirtipes (Taczanowski, 1878) – Peru, Brazil, Guyana, French Guiana
M. huallaga Levi, 2007 – Peru, Bolivia
M. huancabamba Levi, 2007 – Peru
M. ikuruwa Levi, 2007 – Venezuela, Guyana, French Guiana, Peru
M. inconspicua Schenkel, 1936 – China
M. insperata Soares & Camargo, 1948 – Colombia, Peru, Brazil
M. isabel Levi, 2007 – Brazil, French Guiana
M. itabapuana Levi, 2007 – Brazil
M. itatiaia Levi, 2007 – Brazil
M. itza Levi, 2005 – Mexico
M. ixtapan Levi, 2005 – Mexico
M. jumboe Levi, 2007 – Ecuador
M. keduc Levi, 2007 – Brazil
M. kochalkai Levi, 2007 – Colombia
M. kuntur Levi, 2007 – Peru
M. lactea Mello-Leitão, 1944 – Bolivia, Brazil, Argentina
M. laga Levi, 2007 – Peru
M. latica Levi, 2007 – Colombia
M. lechugal Levi, 2007 – Peru, Ecuador
M. leticia Levi, 2007 – Colombia
M. leucogasteroides Roewer, 1955 – Myanmar
M. leverger Levi, 2007 – Brazil, Paraguay
M. logrono Levi, 2007 – Ecuador
M. maculata (Keyserling, 1865) – USA
M. mamiraua Levi, 2007 – Brazil
M. manglar Levi, 2007 – Ecuador
M. manicore Levi, 2007 – Brazil
M. mapia Levi, 2007 – Brazil
M. matamata Levi, 2007 – Colombia
M. mathani Simon, 1895 – Colombia, Peru, Ecuador, Brazil
M. maximiano Levi, 2007 – Brazil
M. melanocephala (Taczanowski, 1874) – Mexico to Argentina
M. melanoleuca Mello-Leitão, 1941 – Argentina
M. melloleitaoi Levi, 2007 – Brazil
M. minacu Levi, 2007 – Brazil
M. missa Levi, 2007 – Brazil, Argentina
M. mitu Levi, 2007 – Colombia
M. mobilis (O. Pickard-Cambridge, 1889) – Mexico to Honduras
M. montana Chickering, 1954 – Costa Rica, Panama
M. morona Levi, 2007 – Ecuador, Brazil
M. moyobamba Levi, 2007 – Peru
M. nahuatl Levi, 2005 – Mexico
M. nonoai Levi, 2007 – Brazil
M. novempupillata Mello-Leitão, 1940 – Colombia, Peru, Bolivia, Brazil
M. nuco Levi, 2007 – Peru
M. oaxaca Levi, 2005 – Mexico
M. ordaz Levi, 2007 – Venezuela
M. ouropreto Santos & Santos, 2011 – Brazil
M. oxapampa Levi, 2007 – Peru
M. pagoreni Levi, 2007 – Peru
M. palenque Levi, 2007 – Ecuador
M. paranaiba Levi, 2007 – Brazil
M. passiva (O. Pickard-Cambridge, 1889) – USA to Nicaragua
M. paula Levi, 2007 – Brazil
M. peichiuta Levi, 2007 – Paraguay
M. pepino Levi, 2007 – Colombia
M. pia Chamberlin & Ivie, 1936 – Panama, Colombia, Venezuela, Brazil
M. picta O. Pickard-Cambridge, 1889 – Mexico to Honduras
M. pira Levi, 2007 – Colombia
M. piratini Rodrigues & Mendonça, 2011 – Brazil
M. piroca Levi, 2007 – Brazil
M. placida (Hentz, 1847) – North America
M. polypicula Yin, Wang, Xie & Peng, 1990 – China
M. porcullo Levi, 2007 – Peru
M. puerto Levi, 2007 – Peru
M. punctipes (Taczanowski, 1878) – Peru
M. purulha Levi, 2005 – Guatemala
M. ramirezi Levi, 2007 – Brazil, Argentina
M. rhombopicta Yin, Wang, Xie & Peng, 1990 – China
M. rondonia Levi, 2007 – Brazil
M. rupununi Levi, 2007 – Guyana
M. saut Levi, 2007 – French Guiana
M. schneirlai Chickering, 1954 – Costa Rica, Panama
M. sciosciae Levi, 2007 – Argentina
M. semiargentea Simon, 1895 – Sri Lanka
M. semiatra Levi, 2007 – Colombia, Venezuela, Peru
M. shudikar Levi, 2007 – Guyana
M. sobradinho Levi, 2007 – Brazil
M. socorpa Levi, 2007 – Colombia
M. songyangensis Yin, Wang, Xie & Peng, 1990 – China
M. spiculata (Hentz, 1847) – USA, China
M. strenua (Keyserling, 1893) – Brazil, Argentina
M. sturmi Levi, 2007 – Colombia
M. sufflava Chickering, 1963 – Panama
M. sumauma Levi, 2007 – Brazil
M. taboquinha Levi, 2007 – Brazil
M. taczanowskii Levi, 2007 – Peru
M. tambo Levi, 2007 – Peru
M. taraira Levi, 2007 – Colombia
M. tarapuy Levi, 2007 – Ecuador, Brazil
M. tarma Levi, 2007 – Peru
M. tefe Levi, 2007 – Colombia, Ecuador, Brazil
M. theridioides Mello-Leitão, 1948 – Guyana
M. tschekiangensis Schenkel, 1963 – China
M. umbrata Simon, 1897 – Peru
M. unam Levi, 2007 – Colombia, Peru, Brazil
M. uraricoera Levi, 2007 – Colombia, Venezuela, Peru, Ecuador, Brazil, Guyana, Suriname, French Guiana
M. uru Levi, 2007 – Peru
M. uziga Levi, 2007 – Paraguay, Argentina
M. v-signata Mello-Leitão, 1943 – Bolivia, Brazil, Argentina
M. vaupes Levi, 2007 – Colombia
M. velha Levi, 2007 – Brazil
M. vianai Levi, 2007 – Argentina
M. villeta Levi, 2007 – Colombia
M. vito Levi, 2005 – Costa Rica
M. volcan Levi, 2005 – Panama
M. yacupoi Levi, 2007 – Argentina
M. yungas Levi, 2007 – Argentina
M. zepol Levi, 2007 – Colombia
M. zona Levi, 2007 – Peru

References

Araneidae
Araneomorphae genera
Spiders of North America
Spiders of South America
Spiders of Asia